Kai Wessel (born 19 September 1961) is a German film director. He has directed more than thirty films since 1988.

Selected filmography
Martha Jellneck (1988)
Klemperer – Ein Leben in Deutschland (1999, TV series)
Goebbels und Geduldig (2001)
The Year of the First Kiss (2002)
March of Millions (2007, TV film)
Hilde (2009)
 (2013, TV miniseries)
Fog in August (2016)

References

External links 

1961 births
Living people
Mass media people from Hamburg